The 2020 Birmingham Bowl was a college football bowl game played on January 2, 2020, with kickoff at 3:00 p.m. EST (2:00 p.m. local CST) on ESPN. It was the 14th edition of the Birmingham Bowl, and was one of the 2019–20 bowl games concluding the 2019 FBS football season.  Sponsored by the TicketSmarter ticket sales company, the game was officially known as the TicketSmarter Birmingham Bowl.

With 7:55 remaining in the first quarter, the game was delayed due to lightning. This was Boston College's second consecutive bowl game that has been impacted by weather, as the 2018 First Responder Bowl (in which Boston College played Boise State) was canceled and ruled a no contest due to inclement weather. The delay lasted a total of 91 minutes before the game resumed at 4:55 p.m. EST.

Teams
The game featured the Boston College Eagles of the Atlantic Coast Conference (ACC) going up against the Cincinnati Bearcats of the American Athletic Conference (The American). This was the eighth overall meeting between the two programs; the Eagles led the all-time series, 4–3.

Boston College Eagles

Boston College entered the game with a 6–6 record (4–4 in conference). They finished in a three-way tie for third place in the ACC's Atlantic Division. The Eagles lost to both ranked opponents they faced, Clemson and Notre Dame. This was the first Birmingham Bowl appearance for Boston College.

Cincinnati Bearcats

Cincinnati entered the game with a 10–3 record (7–1 in conference). They finished atop the East Division of The American, then lost the AAC Championship Game to Memphis, 29–24. The Bearcats were 1–3 against ranked opponents, defeating UCF while falling to Ohio State and Memphis twice. This was Cincinnati's second Birmingham Bowl; their 2007 team won the then-PapaJohns.com Bowl over Southern Miss, 31–21.

Game summary

Statistics

References

External links

Game statistics at statbroadcast.com

Birmingham Bowl
Birmingham Bowl
Birmingham Bowl
Birmingham Bowl
Boston College Eagles football bowl games
Cincinnati Bearcats football bowl games